Big Rapids Township is a charter township of Mecosta County in the U.S. state of Michigan.  As of the 2000 census, the township population was 3,249.

The city of Big Rapids is located within the township, but is administratively autonomous.

Geography

Demographics
As of the census of 2000, there were 3,249 people, 1,200 households, and 813 families residing in the township. The racial makeup of the township was 94.06% White, 2.06% African American, 0.40% Native American, 1.91% Asian, 0.03% Pacific Islander, 0.37% from other races, and 1.17% from two or more races. Hispanic or Latino of any race were 1.02% of the population.

There were 1,200 households, out of which 31.6% had children under the age of 18 living with them, 57.7% were married couples living together, 7.3% had a female householder with no husband present, and 32.3% were non-families. 19.3% of all households were made up of individuals, and 5.7% had someone living alone who was 65 years of age or older.  The average household size was 2.61 and the average family size was 3.02.

In the township the population was spread out, with 23.0% under the age of 18, 15.3% from 18 to 24, 24.7% from 25 to 44, 23.9% from 45 to 64, and 13.1% who were 65 years of age or older.  The median age was 36 years. For every 100 females, there were 104.6 males.  For every 100 females age 18 and over, there were 104.8 males.

The median income for a household in the township was $47,933, and the median income for a family was $60,583. Males had a median income of $38,510 versus $30,893 for females. The per capita income for the township was $22,761.  About 6.0% of families and 10.6% of the population were below the poverty line, including 6.2% of those under age 18 and 8.7% of those age 65 or over.

References

External links
Big Rapids Township official website

Townships in Mecosta County, Michigan
Charter townships in Michigan